The Gary Coleman Show is a 30-minute Saturday morning animated series produced by Hanna-Barbera Productions that originally aired on NBC during the 1982–1983 season. The series featured Gary Coleman as the voice of Andy LeBeau, an apprentice angel, who was dispatched back to Earth to earn his wings by helping others.

The show featured the voices of Gary Coleman, Lauren Anders, Jennifer Darling, Julie McWhirter Dees, Geoffrey Gordon, LaShana Dendy, Jerry Houser, Calvin Mason, Sidney Miller and Steve Schatzberg.

Synopsis
The character of Andy LeBeau was a spin-off character from Coleman's television film The Kid with the Broken Halo (1982). In each episode, Andy was dispatched to help a child in need and resolve his problem by his supervisor and fellow angel, Angelica. The antagonist in each episode was Hornswoggle, who tried to make Andy's mission more difficult, usually by getting him to make the wrong choice or by otherwise complicating the mission. It was up to Andy to correct whatever mistakes he made and foil Hornswoggle's plans.

Cast

 Gary Coleman - Andy LeBeau
 Lauren Anders - Chris
 Jennifer Darling - Angelica
 Julie McWhirter Dees - Lydia
 Geoffrey Gordon - Haggle
 LaShana Dendy - Tina
 Jerry Houser - Bartholomew
 Calvin Mason - Spence
 Sidney Miller - Hornswoggle
 Steve Schatzberg - Mack

Additional voices

 Rick Dees - 
 Patrick Fraley - 
 Billie Hayes - 
 Casey Kasem - Announcer (uncredited)
 Danny Mann - 
 Zelda Rubinstein - 
 Eric Suter - 
 Janet Waldo - 
 Frank Welker -

Episodes

See also
 It's Punky Brewster (1985)

References

External links
 

1982 American television series debuts
1982 American television series endings
1980s American black cartoons
Television series about angels
American children's animated fantasy television series
American animated television spin-offs
Animation based on real people
Animated television shows based on films
English-language television shows
Television series by Hanna-Barbera
Television series by Warner Bros. Television Studios
NBC original programming